The 2011 Alabama State Hornets football team represented Alabama State University as a member of the East Division of the Southwestern Athletic Conference (SWAC) during the 2011 NCAA Division I FCS football season. Led by fifth-year head coach Reggie Barlow, the Hornets compiled an overall record of 8–3 with a mark of 7–2 in conference play, sharing SWAC East Division title with Alabama A&M and Southern. Alabama A&M advanced to SWAC Football Championship Game by virtue of a head-to-head win over the Alabama State, while Southern was ineligible for postseason play due to low Academic Progress Rate (APR) scores. Alabama State played home games at Cramton Bowl in Montgomery, Alabama.

Schedule

References

Alabama State
Alabama State Hornets football seasons
Alabama State Hornets football